Stop, Look and Listen is a 1926 American film comedy film featuring Oliver Hardy. The majority of the film was considered to be lost. Initially in early 2020, it was announced that approximately 10 minutes of footage exists. In March 2020, the full film was discovered by a Japanese film archivist in Tokyo.

Plot
As described in a film magazine review, Luther Meek is a well-behaved young citizen of a small town with a sweetheart named Dorothy who pines for footlight fame. She coaxes him into backing a traveling show in which she is starred. On the opening night of the show, while the stage-struck Dorothy gets muddled in her initial appearance, the Stage Manager and Dorothy's graceless stepbrother rob a bank. Luther is blamed for the crime, but he escapes his persuers and follows the thieves, finally catching him and recovering the money. Dorothy then decides to abandon her stage dreams and weds Luther.

Cast
 Larry Semon as Luther Meek
 Dorothy Dwan as Dorothy
 Mary Carr as Mother
 William Gillespie as Bill
 Lionel Belmore as Sheriff
 B.F. Blinn as The mayor
 Bull Montana as Strong Man
 Oliver Hardy as Show Manager (credited as Babe Hardy)
 Curtis 'Snowball' McHenry as Porter (credited as Curtis McHenry)
 Josef Swickard as Old Actor

See also
 List of American films of 1926
 List of rediscovered films

References

External links

 
 

1926 films
1926 comedy films
1926 short films
1920s rediscovered films
American silent feature films
American black-and-white films
Films directed by Larry Semon
Silent American comedy films
American comedy short films
Pathé Exchange films
Surviving American silent films
Rediscovered American films
1920s American films
1920s English-language films